Smilax medica can refer to:

Smilax medica G.Kirchn., a synonym of Smilax tamnoides L.
Smilax medica M.Martens & Galeotti, a synonym of Smilax bona-nox L.
Smilax medica Schltdl. & Cham., a synonym of Smilax aristolochiifolia Mill.